Texas has a total of 254 counties, many cities, and numerous special districts, the most common of which is the independent school district.

County

Texas has a total of 254 counties, by far the largest number of counties of any state.

Counties in Texas have limited regulatory (ordinance) authority. Counties also have much less legal power than home rule municipalities. They can only pass ordinances (local laws with penalties for violations) in cases where the Texas statutes have given them express permission to. Counties in Texas do not have zoning power (except for limited instances around some reservoirs, military establishments, historic sites and airports, and in large counties over "communication facility structures": visible antennas). However, counties can collect a small portion of property tax and spend it to provide residents with needed services or to employ the power of eminent domain.  Counties also have the power to regulate outdoor lighting near observatories and military bases.  Counties do not have "home rule" authority; whatever powers they enjoy are specifically granted by the State.Unlike other states, Texas does not allow for consolidated city-county governments.  Cities and counties (as well as other political entities) are permitted to enter "interlocal agreements" to share services (for instance, a city and a school district may enter into agreements with the county whereby the county bills for and collects property taxes for the city and school district; thus, only one tax bill is sent instead of three).  Texas does allow municipalities to merge, but populous Harris County, Texas consolidating with its primary city, Houston, Texas, to form the nation's second largest city (after New York City) is not a prospect under current law.

County Government 
Each county is run by a five-member Commissioners' Court consisting of four commissioners elected from single-member districts (called commissioner precincts) and a county judge elected at-large. The county judge does not have authority to veto a decision of the commissioners court; the judge votes along with the commissioners (being the tie-breaker in close calls). In smaller counties, the county judge actually does perform judicial duties, but in larger counties the judge's role is limited to serving on the commissioners court and certifying elections. Certain officials, such as the sheriff and tax collector, are elected separately by the voters, but the commissioners court determines their office budgets, and sets overall county policy. All county elections are partisan, and commissioner precincts are redistricted after each ten year Census both to equalize the voting power in each and in consideration of the political party preferences of the voters in each.

As one textbook produced for use in Texas schools has openly acknowledged, Texas counties are prone to inefficient operations and are vulnerable to corruption, for several reasons.  First, most of them do not have a merit system but operate on a spoils system, so that many county employees obtain their positions through loyalty to a particular political party and commissioner rather than whether they actually have the skills and experience appropriate to their positions.  Second, most counties have not centralized purchasing into a single procurement department which would be able to seek quantity discounts and carefully scrutinize bids and contract awards for unusual patterns.  Third, in 90 percent of Texas counties, each commissioner is individually responsible for planning and executing their own road construction and maintenance program for their own precinct, which results in poor coordination and duplicate construction machinery.

Municipal

Texas does not have townships; areas within a county are either incorporated or unincorporated. Incorporated areas are part of a city, though the city may contract with the county for needed services. Unincorporated areas are not part of a city; in these areas the county has authority for law enforcement and road maintenance. Their local ordinances, rules, and police regulations are usually codified in a "code of ordinances".

City charters 
Cities are classified as either "general law" or "home rule". A city may elect home rule status (i.e., draft an independent city charter) once it exceeds 5,000 population and the voters agree to home rule; however, the charter cannot conflict with either the state Constitution or the general laws of the state. Otherwise, the municipality is classified as general law and has only those very limited powers specified in the general laws. One example of the difference in the two structures regards annexation. General law cities cannot annex adjacent unincorporated areas without the property owners' consent; home rule cities may annex without consent but must provide essential services within a specified period of time (generally within three years) or the property owner may file suit to be disannexed and reimbursed.  Once a city adopts home rule it may continue to keep this status even if the population later falls below 5,000.

Annexation 
Larger cities (those exceeding 225,000) have a unique authority: that of "limited annexation", whereby an adjoining area may be annexed for purposes of imposing city ordinances related to safety and building codes.  The residents can vote for mayor and council races but cannot vote in bond elections (and, consequently, the city cannot directly collect city sales tax from businesses or city property tax from owners).

However, the City of Houston has exploited a glitch in the state law that allows it to share in sales tax revenues along with special districts (municipal utility districts, for instance) that cross an area "annexed for limited purposes." This has led to a spiderwebbing known as limited purpose or special purpose annexations that consist of mostly commercial properties facing major streets. These extend through otherwise unincorporated areas. It has also led to conflicts between city and county officials over the provision of services to these areas not included in the agreements.

The purpose of limited annexation is to allow the city to control development in an area that it eventually will fully annex; it is meant to do so within three years (though it can arrange "non-annexation agreements" with local property owners), and those agreements with municipal utility districts also cloud the picture.  During each of the three years, the city is to develop land use planning for the area (zoning, for example), identify needed capital improvements and ongoing projects, and identify the financing for such as well as to provide essential municipal services.

Municipal Elections 

Municipal elections in Texas are nonpartisan in the sense that candidates do not appear on the ballot on party lines, and do not run as party tickets. However, a candidate's party affiliation is usually known or can be discerned with minimal effort (as the candidate most likely has supported other candidates on partisan tickets). In some instances, an informal citizen's group will support a slate of candidates that it desires to see elected (often in opposition to an incumbent group with which it disagreed on an issue). However, each candidate must be voted on individually.

Special districts
In addition to cities and counties, Texas has numerous special districts. The most common is the independent school district. Special districts include Groundwater Conservation Districts (regulatory agencies), river authorities, port authorities, water supply districts (for irrigation or municipal supply), public hospitals, road districts and community college districts.

School districts

Independent school districts have a board of trustees that is independent of any other governing authority, with the exception of the Stafford Municipal School District. School district boundaries are not generally aligned with city or county boundaries; it is common for a school district to cover one or more counties or for a large city to be served by several school districts.

As with municipal elections in Texas, board members or trustees are elected on a nonpartisan basis or may be appointed.

The Texas Education Agency governs public education in Texas.

References

 
Texas